The men's 10 metre running target mixed competition at the 2018 Asian Games in Palembang, Indonesia was held on 27 September at the Jakabaring International Shooting Range.

Schedule
All times are Western Indonesia Time (UTC+07:00)

Records

Results

References

ISSF Results Overview

External links
Official website

Men RT X